Giuseppe Piccioni (born 2 July 1953) is an Italian film director and screenwriter. He has directed nine films since 1987. His 2004 film The Life That I Want was entered into the 27th Moscow International Film Festival.

Selected filmography
 Ask for the Moon - 1990
 Diary of a Man Condemned to Marriage - 1993
 Penniless Hearts - 1996
 Not of this World (Fuori dal mundo) - 1999
 Light of My Eyes - 2001
 The Life That I Want - 2004
 Giulia Doesn't Date at Night - 2009)
 The Red and the Blue - 2012
 Questi giorni - 2016
 L'ombra del giorno - 2016

References

External links

1953 births
Living people
Italian film directors
Italian screenwriters
Italian male screenwriters
People from Ascoli Piceno
Ciak d'oro winners